Pseudosesia zoniota is a moth of the family Sesiidae. It is known only from the female holotype which was collected near the Claudie River on the Cape York Peninsula in Queensland, Australia.

External links
Australian Faunal Directory
Classification of the Superfamily Sesioidea (Lepidoptera: Ditrysia)
New records and a revised checklist of the Australian clearwing moths (Lepidoptera: Sesiidae)

Moths of Australia
Sesiidae
Moths described in 1922